A Roscommon County Council election was held in County Roscommon in Ireland on 24 May 2019 as part of that year's local elections. All 18 councillors were elected for a five-year term of office from 3 local electoral areas (LEAs) by single transferable vote. Only three political parties (Fine Gael, Fianna Fáil and Sinn Féin) fielded candidates in Roscommon, the fewest of any Irish county/city in the 2019 local elections. The 2018 LEA boundary review committee made no changes to the LEAs used in the 2014 elections.

Results by party

Results by local electoral area

Athlone

Boyle

Roscommon

Results by gender

Footnotes

Sources

References

2019 Irish local elections
2019